Hanna Aronsson Elfman (born 29 December 2002) is a Swedish World Cup alpine ski racer, who specialises in the Slalom and Giant Slalom. She made her World Cup debut at age seventeen in February 2020. She is the 2021 and 2023 Junior World Champion in Giant Slalom, as well as the 2023 Junior World Champion in Slalom. She competed in the 2022 Winter Olympics in Beijing.

Former Olympic free skier Marja von Stedingk is her maternal aunt.

World Cup results

Season standings

Results per discipline

Olympic Games

References

External links
 
 

2002 births
Living people
Swedish female alpine skiers
Alpine skiers at the 2020 Winter Youth Olympics
Alpine skiers at the 2022 Winter Olympics
Olympic alpine skiers of Sweden
Sportspeople from Karlstad
21st-century Swedish women